Siri Broch Johansen (born 9 March 1967) is a Sami author, singer, and textbook author from Tana, Finnmark. She is also language leader at the Samisk Nærings- og Utredningssenter in Tana.

She trains teachers and teaches Sami language and has a great deal of experience of working with the Sami language, and has formerly taught in Kåfjord, Troms. She has also written and edited a textbook on indigenous peoples of the north.

Works
 1992 Opp av brønnen – Poetry
 1997 Mii leat ain dás (Vi er ennå her) – textbook on indigenous peoples of the North
 2001 Mearrasámit
 2005 Sámi skuvlahistorjá 1 (Sami school history)
 2007 Sámi skuvlahistorjá 2 (Sami school history)
 2009 Sámi skuvlahistorjá 3 (Sami school history)

External links 
 Book conference at Skolefokus nr. 20-1997
  Panelist at Sámi Grand Prix 2002
 Sami school history
 Siri Broch Johansen: From Norwegian language student to Sami learner. Article

1967 births
Living people
People from Tana, Norway
20th-century Norwegian poets
Norwegian Sámi people
Norwegian women poets
Norwegian songwriters
Norwegian Sámi-language writers
20th-century Norwegian women writers